Trautmann is an Austrian television series.

See also
List of Austrian television series

External links
 

ORF (broadcaster)
Austrian crime television series
2000 Austrian television series debuts
2008 Austrian television series endings
2000s Austrian television series
German-language television shows